Derek Scrimgour (born 29 March 1978) is a former professional footballer, who played for St Mirren in the 2000–01 Scottish Premier League.

References

External links

1978 births
Living people
Scottish footballers
St Mirren F.C. players
Berwick Rangers F.C. players
Dumbarton F.C. players
Queen's Park F.C. players
Scottish Premier League players
Scottish Football League players
Association football goalkeepers
Scotland under-21 international footballers
Footballers from Glasgow
Johnstone Burgh F.C. players
Renfrew F.C. players
Scottish Junior Football Association players